Koźminek  is a town in Kalisz County, Greater Poland Voivodeship, in west-central Poland. It is the seat of the gmina (administrative district) called Gmina Koźminek.

The town has a population of 1,800.

References

Kalisz County